Oluf Wesmann-Kjær (2 July 1874 – 16 September 1945) was a Norwegian shooter who competed in the early 20th century in rifle shooting.

He was born in Nannestad. At the 1920 Summer Olympics he competed in the 50 metre free pistol event, and finished seventh in the team clay pigeons event. At the 1924 Summer Olympics he finished thirteenth in the 100 metre running deer, double shots event, sixteenth in the trap event and seventh in the team clay pigeons event.

He died in 1945 in Oslo.

References

1874 births
1945 deaths
ISSF rifle shooters
Norwegian male sport shooters
Shooters at the 1920 Summer Olympics
Shooters at the 1924 Summer Olympics
Olympic shooters of Norway
People from Nannestad
Sportspeople from Oslo
20th-century Norwegian people